Slinger or slingers may refer to:

 Slinger, a soldier who specializes in using a sling
 Slinger (dish), a specialty dish served in American, mid-western diners.
 Slingers (Marvel Comics), a fictional group of superheroes in the Marvel Comics universe
 Slinger, Wisconsin, a village in Wisconsin, United States
 Slinger High School
 HMS Slinger (1917), an aircraft catapult vessel purchased 1917 and sold 1919
 HMS Slinger (D26), built as USS Chatham, on Lend-Lease from 1942 to 1946
 Singapore Slingers, a club in the Australian National Basketball League

People with the surname
 Joey Slinger, Canadian journalist and humourist
 Jonathan Slinger, British actor
 Michael Slinger, academic
 Mimi Slinger, British actress
 Penny Slinger, American artist
 Richard Slinger, professional wrestler

See also
 Slinger Super Speedway, an automobile race track in Slinger, Wisconsin
 Sling (disambiguation)